Nik-L-Nip is a brand of confectionery created by Vinny Cavallo in the early 20th century that comes in a variety of fruit flavors, marketed by Tootsie Roll Industries. The Nik-L-Nip brand name is a combination of the original cost (a nickel, $0.05) and the preferred method of opening wax bottles, which is to nip (bite) the top off. It has a fruity-tasting liquid flavoring inside of it. Once the top of the small, bottle-shaped wax containers has been bitten off, one can drink the fruit-flavored syrup inside. Afterward the wax can be chewed like gum. The wax in Nik-L-Nip wax bottles is food-grade and non-toxic, although it is meant to be chewed and not swallowed.

See also
 List of confectionery brands

References

Tootsie Roll Industries brands
Candy